Benét Laboratories, part of the US Army Combat Capabilities Development Command Armaments Center, is the US Army's primary design, development, engineering and production and field support facility for large caliber armament systems, including cannons, mortars, and recoilless rifles. The facility also works on tank gun mounts and turret components and munition handling systems.

It is located at the Watervliet Arsenal in upstate New York. It is a part of the Weapons & Software Engineering Center (WSEC), US Army Combat Capabilities Development Command Armaments Center, which is located at Picatinny Arsenal, New Jersey. Laboratory simulations are performed studying gun firing phenomena, and using static and dynamic load testing (up to 5 million lb), as well as environmental testing.

The laboratories are named after the first chief of Army ordnance, Brigadier General Stephen Vincent Benét.

Sources

External links 
 Benét Laboratories site

Albany County, New York
Research installations of the United States Army
Military facilities in New York (state)
Watervliet, New York